Lookout Point is a British television production company based in London, United Kingdom. Lookout Point TV is a wholly-owned subsidiary of BBC Studios, producing content for the BBC and for other television channels in the United Kingdom.

Shows produced 
A Suitable Boy - BBC, Netflix and Acorn TV
Last Tango in Halifax - BBC
Gentleman Jack - BBC and HBO
Les Misérables - BBC and Masterpiece
Press - BBC and Masterpiece
War & Peace - BBC and A&E Networks
To Walk Invisible - BBC and Masterpiece
Ripper Street - BBC and Amazon Studios
The Collection - Amazon Studios

References

Television production companies of the United Kingdom
BBC
Mass media companies based in London
British companies established in 2009